Loïc Vynisale (born 10 March 1986) is a French male canoeist who won medals at senior level at the Wildwater Canoeing World Championships.

References

External links
 Loïc Vynisale at FFCK

1986 births
Living people
French male canoeists